The WebWhacker was an early offline browser.

Reception
The WebWhacker was well received, though it received criticism for the inability to adjust the size of the toolbar, and not enough control as to which pages get whacked.

See also
 WebEx
 ClearWeb

References

External links
Web Whacking 
Web Whacker Review

Macintosh web browsers
Windows web browsers